Sinasir is a Nigerian delicacy made from rice popular amongst the northern region. The type of rice used are of two types: Cooked and soaked rice.

The rice meal is prepared by blending cooked and soaked rice which are blended and fried. Other ingredients used include sugar, salt, milk, egg, onion, and vegetable oil.

Sinasir is one of the many sweet recipe in the northern part of Nigeria. It tastes so sweet and delicious that it will keep you asking for more, it is basically made with short grain rice the one used to make tuwon shinkafa. Also it is very easy to make.

Ingredients 

 3 cups of short grain rice
 2 cups of parboiled rice
 2 teaspoon of yeast
 1/2 teaspoon of baking powder
 4 teaspoon of sugar
 Vegetable oil
 A cup of water
 Pinch of salt
 Onions

Preparations 

 Step1; parboil a little amount of rice, then;
 Step2; pour some amount of rice needed in a clean bowl and add enough water inside the rice to soak for more than 3 hours.
 Step3; wash the rice properly to look clean, drain off the water and rinse the rice.

 Step4; add some warm water into the yeast to proof it and set it aside.
 Step5; when the rinsing is done, blend the soaked rice with a little water, when done, add the parboiled rice and blend it too.
 Step6; mix it together and stir it very well, then add a little bit of small water and stir until it becomes soft.
 Step7; after then, add a pinch of salt, sugar,  and the proofed yeast, stir and together until well combined.
 Step8; add the small pieces of cut onions into the batter, the batter should not be too thick and too watery.
 Step9; cover it up and allow it to proof for more than 2 hours, when it is done, it is time for frying.
 Step11; pour the batter into the frying pan and allow it to fry for 4 minutes,  when fried, flip it up to the other side and allow to fry for 2 minutes.
 Step12; take it off the heat and put it inside a warmer and cover so that it does not  get cold, then repeat the previous steps until all sinasir have been exhausted.

See also 
 Nigerian cuisine

References 

Nigerian cuisine
Rice dishes
Hausa cuisine